The Havriliak–Negami relaxation is an empirical modification of the Debye relaxation model in electromagnetism. Unlike the Debye model, the Havriliak–Negami relaxation accounts for the asymmetry and broadness of the dielectric dispersion curve. The model was first used to describe the dielectric relaxation of some polymers, by adding two exponential parameters to the Debye equation:

The exponents  and  describe the asymmetry and broadness of the corresponding spectra.

Depending on application, the Fourier transform of the stretched exponential function can be a viable alternative that has one parameter less.

Mathematical properties

Real and imaginary parts 

The storage part  and the loss part  of the permittivity (here:  with ) can be calculated as

and

with

Loss peak 

The maximum of the loss part lies at

Superposition of Lorentzians 

The Havriliak–Negami relaxation can be expressed as a superposition of individual Debye relaxations

with the real valued distribution function

where

if the argument of the arctangent is positive, else

Noteworthy,  becomes imaginary valued for

and complex valued for

Logarithmic moments 

The first logarithmic moment of this distribution, the average logarithmic relaxation time is

where  is the digamma function and  the Euler constant.

Inverse Fourier transform 

The inverse Fourier transform of the Havriliak-Negami function (the corresponding time-domain relaxation function) can be numerically calculated. It can be shown that the series expansions involved are special cases of the Fox–Wright function. In particular, in the time-domain the corresponding of  can be represented as

where  is the Dirac delta function and

is a special instance of the Fox–Wright function and, precisely, it is the three parameters Mittag-Leffler function also known as the Prabhakar function. The function  can be numerically evaluated, for instance, by means of a Matlab code
.

See also 
 Cole–Cole equation
 Cole–Davidson equation
 Dielectric spectroscopy
 Dipole

References

Electric and magnetic fields in matter